Augusta Kaiser (16 January 1895 – 27 September 1932) was a modern German sculptor and ceramic artist who called herself Gust Kaiser from 1922 on. She is also known as Gustl Kaiser in connection to her ceramics work for the Kieler Kunst-Keramik pottery works.

Life
Augusta Theodora Priscilla Kaiser was the daughter of teacher Peter Josef Kaiser and Augusta Schneider. From 1906 her father worked in Wiesbaden, where Augusta graduated school. She graduated with top honors from the Kunstgewerbeschule in Mainz and continued her education at the Academy of Fine Arts, Karlsruhe.

In 1922 she met the painter Hedwig Marquardt who was working at the time as ceramics painter at the Großherzoglichen Majolika-Manufaktur Karlsruhe. As her partner she followed her in April 1924 to Kiel, where they both worked as artists for the Kieler Kunst-Keramik (KKK) until 31 March 1925.

They worked as freelance artists in Biere near Magdeburg in their own "Workshop for Applied Art", which they had to close in 1927 due to financial reasons. Afterwards the couple lived in Hanover, where Marquardt was an art teacher. After a long disease she returned to her parents' house in Wiesbaden, where she died in 1932.

Kieler Kunst-Keramik AG 

Kaiser was, like Marquardt, one of the first artists of the KKK. She designed the majority of the fine ceramics, small figurines and vessels in the short time where she was associated with KKK, in addition to works for the construction department. All her designs are styled in the expressionist form language of the Art Deco. KKK participated in the Grassi fair in Leipzig in 1924 with art mostly by Kaiser and Marquardt.

Kaisers design for the facade of the Städtische Milchhalle Hirte in Altona, Hamburg is remarkable, but the building was destroyed during the Second World War. Her designs for KKK were highly appreciated already in the contemporary literature, which lauded her as a talented artist.

Selected literature
 Wilhelm Conrad Gomoll: Neues schleswig-holsteinisches Kunstgewerbe. In: Die Buchgemeinde. Vol. 8, 1926, pp. 336–341.
 Wilhelm Conrad Gomoll: Kieler Kunst-Keramik. In: Alexander Koch (ed.): Deutsche Kunst und Dekoration, Illustrierte Monatshefte für moderne Malerei, Plastik, Architektur. Darmstadt 1926, Vol. 58, pp. 389–394, with illustrations
 Thomas Habeck: Die „Kieler Kunstkeramik AG“ und ihre Beziehung zur Baukunst der 20er Jahre in Schleswig-Holstein. Phil. Diss. Univ. Kiel, Kiel 1981, pp. 54, 205–208.
 Joachim and Angelika Konietzny: Augusta Kaiser – die Gustl Kaiser der Kieler Kunstkeramik – und ihr Leben mit Hedwig Marquardt. Afterword: Laurence Marsh. Pansdorf 2011, .
 Joachim and Angelika Konietzny (eds.): Hedwig Marquardt, Augusta Kaiser: ein Künstlerinnenpaar; Briefe an Lotte Boltze aus den Jahren 1922–1931. with an essay by Laurence Marsh. Pansdorf 2013, .
 Bärbel Manitz and Hans-Günther Andresen: Kieler Kunst-Keramik. Neumünster 2004, .
 Christel Marsh: Ends and Beginnings. London 2004, pp. 277–284, 292–293, .
 Richard B. Parkinson: A Little Gay History: Desire and Diversity Across the World. British Museum Press, 2013, .
 Otto Riedrich: Neue Baukeramik Schleswig-Holsteins mit einem Einblick in die Baukunstgedanken der Gegenwart. In: Schleswig-Holsteinisches Jahrbuch. 1927, pp. 23–38.
 Ernst Sauermann: Neue Wege. In: Schleswig-Holsteinisches Jahrbuch. 1925/26, p. 105 ff.
 Konrad Strauß: Deutsche Keramik der Gegenwart. Halle/Saale 1927, p. 21–22 and illustrations p. 7–8
 Maria-Gesine Thies: Die Kieler Kunst-Keramik AG: Keramik der 1920er Jahre in Kiel. Phil. Diss. Univ. Kiel, Kiel 1988.

Museum collections
 Kieler Stadtmuseum, Kiel (Gustl Kaiser)
 Schleswig-Holsteinisches Landesmuseum Schloss Gottorf, Schleswig (Gustl Kaiser)
 British Museum, London (Augusta Kaiser)

References

External links
 Works of art as Gustl Kaiser on europeana.eu
 Ceramics in the collections of the museums of Schleswig-Holstein und Hamburg
 Works of the Kieler Kunst-Keramik in the British Museum
 Short biography

1895 births
1932 deaths
German ceramists
German women ceramists
German women sculptors
German LGBT sculptors
German lesbian artists
Lesbian sculptors
20th-century German sculptors
20th-century ceramists
20th-century German women artists
20th-century LGBT people